John Page may refer to:

Politicians
John Page (MP for Maldon) (fl. 1391–1407), MP for Maldon
John Page (died 1779) (c. 1696–1779), British member of Parliament for Chichester and Great Grimsby
John Page (Virginia politician) (1743–1808), U.S. Congressman, Governor of Virginia
John Page (New Hampshire politician) (1787–1865), U.S. Senator, Governor of New Hampshire
John Page (MP for Harrow West) (1919–2008), British Conservative Member of Parliament 1960–1987
John A. Page (1814–1891), Vermont banker and political figure
John B. Page (1826–1885), American politician and governor of Vermont
John Percy Page (1887–1973), Canadian teacher and Lieutenant Governor of Alberta
Derek Page, Baron Whaddon (John Derek Page, 1927–2005), British life peer and politician

Others
John Page (planter) (1628–1692), resident of Middle Plantation in the Virginia Colony
John E. Page (1799–1867), early leader of the Latter Day Saint movement
John Page (cricketer), English cricketer who played first-class cricket from 1819 to 1822
John Page (figure skater) (1900–1947), British figure skater
John U. D. Page (1904–1950), American soldier, awarded the Medal of Honor in the Korean War
John Page (footballer, born 1901) (1901–1979), English footballer
John Page (footballer, born 1934) (1934–2006), full-back with Southampton F.C., 1952–1961
John Page (banker) (died 2005), Chief Cashier of the Bank of England between 1970 and 1980
Johnny Page, singer with The Marylanders

See also
Jack Page (disambiguation)
Jonathan Page (disambiguation)